Events from the year 1604 in Ireland.

Incumbent
Monarch: James I

Events
July 11 – Derry chartered as a city.

Births
March 10 (claimed) – David Barry, 1st Earl of Barrymore (d. 1642)
Ulick Burke, 1st Marquess of Clanricarde, nobleman and figure in English Civil War (d. 1657)
Nicholas French, Bishop of Ferns, political activist and pamphleteer (d. 1678)

Deaths
January 28 – Brian Oge O'Rourke, King of West Breifne.
Katherine FitzGerald, Countess of Desmond (b. c.1464)

References

 
1600s in Ireland
Ireland
Years of the 17th century in Ireland